The seventh season of the series Show Me the Money, known as Show Me the Money 777 (also referred to as SMTM777), premiered on September 7, 2018 and ended on November 9, 2018. It is on broadcast every Friday at 23:00 KST on Mnet.

This season features judges Swings and Giriboy from Just Music, Deepflow and Nucksal of Vismajor Company (VMC), Paloalto of Hi-Lite Records and Code Kunst of AOMG, and The Quiett of Illionaire Records and Changmo of Ambition Musik.

Different from previous seasons, this season does not have the first preliminary round. Instead, the production crew watched over 13,000 audition videos and selected about 1,000 contestants. These selected contestants then were judged by the producers teams, and the qualified ones will move on to Round Two.

There is a new betting system that is used this season. 200 million won (the winner's final prize money) will be equally divided among the four producer teams (50 million won for each team) prior to Round Two, and can be used to evaluate each passed rapper's rap in the round.

The winner of this season was Nafla with Team Just Music's Swings and Giriboy as the winning producers.

Judges 
Team Just Music:
 Swings : Founder and rapper of Just Music, its sub-label Indigo Music, and recently established WEDAPLUGG Records. Previously participated in season 2 as a contestant under Team D.O, and in season 3 as a judge/producer alongside San E under Team Brand New Music.
 Giriboy : Rapper, songwriter and record producer signed under Just Music and WEDAPLUGG Records. Previously participated in season 3 as a contestant under Team YDG. Member of WYBH crew.

Team VMC (also known as Team 119):
 Deepflow : CEO, rapper and producer of Vismajor Company (VMC).
 Nucksal : Rapper signed under VMC. Previously participated in season 2 as a contestant, and in season 6 where he finished first runner-up.

Team Hi-Lite & AOMG (also known as Team CodePalo):
 Paloalto : Founder, rapper and producer of Hi-Lite Records. Previously participated in season 4 as a judge/producer for Team ZiPal.
 Code Kunst : Music producer signed under AOMG. Previously signed with HIGHGRND.

Team Illionaire Ambition:
 The Quiett : Co-founder, rapper and producer of Illionaire Records. Previously participated in seasons 3 and 5 as a judge/producer under Team Illionaire.
 Changmo : Rapper and producer signed under Ambition Musik, the sub-label of Illionaire Records. Previously auditioned in season 3.

Teams
During Round Five of the competition, four contestants were chosen to be in each team as follows:

Team Just Music:
 ODEE : Rapper signed under Vismajor Company (VMC). Previously participated in season 3.
 Nafla : Rapper from Pasadena, California where he's the member of his label/crew MKIT RAIN and member of “42” crew. Gained popularity in the Korean hip-hop scene after his collaboration with Dynamic Duo in 2015.
 YunB : New York-based rapper/producer signed under Hi-Lite Records.
 OLNL : Korean rapper signed under STONESHIP. Member of WYBH and JUICEOVERALCOHOL crews, part of Korean rap duo AREYOUCHILDISH.

Team VMC (also known as Team 119):
 Chaboom : Veteran rapper signed under Lay Back Records. Member of project rap groups BLING THE CASH and GRAY ROOFTOP. During the 1st Live Performance Round, he revealed that he suffers from Guillain–Barré Syndrome, an auto-immune disorder, causing him to have difficulty in his everyday activities.
 Los : LA-based rapper signed under Feel GHood Music's sub-label GHood Life. Previously signed with Cycadelic Records. Previously auditioned in season 6.
 EK : Member of rap group/dance crew Most Badass Asian (M.B.A) under STONESHIP. Previously auditioned in SBS K-pop Star.
 Keem Hyo-eun : Rapper under Illionaire Records' sub-label Ambition Muzik. Previously auditioned in season 3, and in season 5 where he was a member of Team Illionaire. Also known by his moniker “Kenny Raw”.

Team Hi-Lite & AOMG (also known as TEAMCODEPALO):
 pH-1 : New York-based rapper/producer signed under AOMG's sub-label H1GHR MUSIC. Member of collab duo Sous Chef with fellow contestant Owen Ovadoz.
 Kid Milli : Korean rapper under Just Music's sub-label Indigo Music. Member of COZYBOYS and WYBH crews. Former pro-gamer who once participated in StarCraft’s semiprofessional tournament.
 Qwala : Member of the OSAMARI Crew (OSA). Previously auditioned in seasons 2, 5 and 6.
 Loopy : LA-based rapper/producer signed under record label/crew MKIT RAIN. Originally started as a producer, he decided to try rapping after moving to LA.

Team Illionaire Ambition (also known as QUAMO GANG):
 Superbee : A regular mainstay of Show Me The Money where he auditioned in the first three seasons and finally made it in season 4 as a member of Team YG and season 5 where he was the second runner-up and member of Team Illionaire. Formerly signed with Feel GHood Music's sub-label GHood Life and a member of the 82HottestMC's. Currently is a co-CEO of a recently established YNG & Rich Records with rapper Uneducated Kid. In an interview prior to season 5's final round, he jokingly stated that he'll keep competing in the future seasons until he finally becomes the champion.
 Lee Dong-min : Fourth runner-up in the first season of High School Rapper. Also known by his monikers RAPTO and ICE PUFF.
 D.Ark : Second youngest contestant in the show's history at 15 years old (Korean Age). Lived in China for 10 years and is trilingual in Korean, Chinese and English. Member of Blue Alien Crew. He was later involved in a sex scandal with his ex-girlfriend.
 Coogie : Rookie rapper who started rapping less than a year ago. Signed under ATM Seoul, which was then bought by Million Market. Became a member of YELOWS MOB crew after his elimination from the show (also known as YLS MOB).

Rounds 
Prior to Round One, about 13,000 contestants sent in their audition clips to the production crew and they will watch each clip and select about 1,000 to participate in Round One.
 Round One: Rapper Selection Round – After sending in their audition clips, those selected by the production crew will attend this round. These contestants will choose one of the four producer teams they want to be judged by, and they will be judged by their choice of the producer teams through a short a cappella rap. Chains are handed to contestants that have passed to the next round. 140 contestants advanced to the next round.
 Round Two: Rapper Open Evaluation Round – Contestants have one minute to rap in front of all judges and all passed contestants from Round One. At least one team of judges must pass the rapper in order to move on to Round Three, the Fight Money Battle Round. The team(s) that have passed the rapper can each place their bets to evaluate the rapper's rap, from a minimum of 100,000 won to a maximum of 5,000,000 won. Each passed rapper can be evaluated for a maximum of 20 million won. The total amount of money the passed rapper received will be carried over to Round Three as his/her Fight Money. A total of 60 contestants advanced to the next round.

List of Passed Rappers and Notable Failed Rappers at the Rapper Open Evaluation Round

 PASSED by the Producer Team
 FAILED by the Producer Team
 Round Three: Fight Money Battle Round + Revival Round – The bets each rapper received from Round Two has been carried forward to this round. Different from the 1-on-1 Rap Battles that have been used in previous seasons, for this round, there can be a triple battle. MC Kim Jin-pyo will randomly pick a card with a rapper's name, and contestants that want to battle against this picked rapper can step forward to ask for a battle. The picked rapper will then pick one of the rappers for a 1-on-1 rap battle. A triple battle is established if a picked rapper picks two of the rapper challengers, or when one rapper wants to go up and join an already set 1-on-1 rap battle. The winner of each triple battle will take all the money of the two other rappers in each triple battle, and the latter two will also be eliminated from the show. In the event of a tie, a sudden death 1-on-1 match will be held to determine the winner. Selected rappers that were eliminated in this round will participate in the 1-on-1 revival round, where the winner of each 1-on-1 battle will advance to the next round, the Group Battle. The winner of each Revival Round battle will receive 100,000 won as Fight Money.

 Indicates the winner.
 Round Four: Group Battle – The remaining 24 contestants after Round Three will be split into two teams: Team Nafla and Team Superbee, named after the two rappers that currently have the most Fight Money accumulated. Each group will take turns as they do freestyle/pre-rehearsed raps under certain beats. The winning group will advance to the Team Choosing Round, with the group receiving 50,000,000 won that is to be equally distributed. In the case of a tie after two rounds, a third round will be held to determine the winning group. All groups will advance in the team choosing round.

 Round Five: Producers Stages/Team Choosing – Producers will have live performances to determine which team will get the first pick. The remaining contestants will vote which producer team had the best performance. In the Team Choosing segment, each contestant ranked from the least Fight Money earned to the most Fight Money earned will choose which producer team he will join. The chosen producer team will make a choice whether to accept him or not. All producer teams will show their bet money before the contestant makes his decision. A total of four contestants per producer team will be set. If there are more than four members in the team, the latest contestant picked by that producer team will choose which contestant he will replace in the team, causing the replaced contestant to be eliminated from the show. The remaining contestants not selected by any team will also be eliminated.

Ranking of Producers Stages

List of advancing rappers and eliminated rappers after Team Choosing

Color key

Total accumulated Fight Money for each team

 Round Six: Team Song Mission –  All producer teams travel to Hong Kong for their team bonding and Team Song Mission preparations. Just like in the previous seasons, each producer team performs in front of all the judges, and the judges will eliminate one contestant from their own team at the end of each performance.

 Round Seven: Team Diss Battle –  Producers from opposing teams play rock, paper, scissors to determine the teams that get to choose their opponents for this round. Three 1-vs-1 diss battles will be held for each round. Each of the teams' judges will place Fight Money bets on their own teams (only 1 million, 3 million, 5 million, 7 million and 10 million won bets are allowed and can only choose 1 value). The winning team will receive twice the bet amount they have put, while the losing team will lose the bet amount they have put.

 Indicates the winning team.
 Indicates the winning contestant/s.

Money distribution to each contestant after Team Diss Battle

 Round Eight: 1st Live Performances - Following the results of the team diss battles, winning teams will have their contestants choose their opponents in order of money distributed before this round. Contestants have live performances with the producer/s and/or with featuring(s) of other artist(s). Based on the combined number of live audience votes after two rounds of voting, the winner of each battle advances to the next round and gets all of his opponent's money while the loser gets eliminated. In the event that all contestants in one team lose against their individual opponents after this round, their entire team will be eliminated from the show.

 Indicates the winning performance.

Total Team Fight Money accumulated after the 1st Live Performance Round

 Entire team was eliminated from the show after none of its contestants advanced to the semifinal round.
 Round Nine: Top 6 Special Performance + Semi-final Performances - The Top 6 contestants will open up the semi-final round with a special stage performance together, with the song produced by GRAY, to honor the judge producers and members of Team VMC, who were all eliminated after none of the team's contestants advanced to the Top 6. The top two contestants that received the most money from the previous round gets to choose their individual opponents for this round. The remaining six contestants will each have a solo performance with a guest performer(s). The contestant who received more combined number of live audience votes after two rounds of voting against their match-up advances to the finals and gets all of his opponent's money while the loser gets eliminated.

 Indicates the winning performance.

Total Team Fight Money accumulated after the Semifinal Round

 Entire team was eliminated from the show after none of its contestants advanced to the final round.
 Final Round: Final + Special Performances  (Live Episode) – The final round is televised live with votes from both the TV viewers and the live audience. For the first time in Show Me the Money's history, at least two contestants from the same team are in the final round, with Team Hi-Lite AOMG's Loopy and Kid Milli progressing from the Semi-final Performances Round. In the first part of the finals, all three remaining finalists will perform live on stage alone and/or a special guest performer(s). In the second part of the finals, they will each have one last performance with the producer(s) and with a special guest performer(s). The contestant who earned the most votes will be this season's champion and receive the final prize money of 200,000,000 won. The live episode included a special debut stage from Mommy Son, the pink masked rapper which was revealed to be Mad Clown, whose shocking elimination earlier this season caused the sudden rise in his popularity. The performance featured Bae Ki-sung and season 5 contestant Donutman, who is the rapper Mommy Son apologized to in his song for not giving the mic during the mic selection back in season 5. A special collaboration stage by EK, ODEE, Zene The Zilla and Coogie is included in the live episode.

 Indicates winner of Show Me The Money 777.
 Indicates 1st runner-up of Show Me The Money 777.
 Indicates 2nd runner-up of Show Me The Money 777.

Show Me The Money 777 Top 16

 WINNER  The contestant won Show Me the Money 777.
 Runner-Up  The contestant was the runner-up.
 3rd place  The contestant was the 3rd place.
 ALL-PASS  The contestant received an All-Pass during the second round.
 3 PASS  The contestant received one fail during the second round.
 2 PASS  The contestant received two fails during the second round.
 1 PASS  The contestant only received one pass during the second round.
 UNREVEALED  The contestant's pass/fail scores were not revealed but passed the second round.
 ELIM  The contestant was eliminated.
 WON  The contestant's team won during the Group Battle Round
 WON  The contestant's team won during the diss battle round.
 The contestant did not participate in this round.

Notable contestants
 Mommy Son : The pink-masked Korean rapper which was later revealed to be former season 2 contestant and season 5 judge Mad Clown. After passing the Rapper Selection round, fellow contestants, notably Snacky Chan and Pento, questioned Mommy Son's real identity, in which he later revealed his true identity to them. After the show's first episode, netizens posted comments on Mad Clown's Instagram page stating that Mad Clown was indeed Mommy Son, in which he quickly shut down the rumors that he's not the man behind Mommy Son and instead gave Mommy Son's actual Instagram account. In the Rapper Open Evaluation Round, the judges, notably Swings, asked him to remove the mask, knowing that it was Mad Clown all along. However, he refused to do so, stating that the mask is an artistic tool for him to fully express himself as an artist and the Mommy Son character is solely for his joy regardless of whether they found out his true identity. Unfortunately, Mommy Son was eliminated after forgetting his lyrics. Following his elimination from the show, he released a hilarious diss rap "Shonen Jump", dissing the judges from the show and expressing his strong desires to get back up. His popularity grew, which resulted in multiple magazine and television appearances, and fans wearing pink masks and gloves to imitate him. 
 Onesun : First generation Korean hip-hop artist who previously auditioned in season 5 and season 6, where he was known for his famous phrase "Let Me Do it Again" after failing the latter season's preliminary round. He returned this season but failed to pass the Rapper Selection round.
 Owen Ovadoz : Rapper and member of the crew/record company MKIT RAIN alongside fellow contestants Nafla and Loopy. Previously participated in seasons 3 and 4. Eliminated in the Fight Money Battle Round.
 Choi Eun-seo : 15 year old rapper who is a member of AS Clan. Eliminated in the Fight Money Battle Round.
 Snacky Chan : Rapper under Dynasty Muzik. Previously participated in season 3 as a member of Team YG and in seasons four and five. Eliminated in the Fight Money Battle Round.
 Osshun Gum : Rapper under Just Music and first runner-up of the first season of High School Rapper. Eliminated in the Fight Money Battle Round.
 Reddy : Rapper under Hi-Lite Records. Previously participated in season 5 as a member of Team YG. Eliminated in the Revival Round.
 Maniac : Korean-American veteran rapper under his own label, PayDay Entertainment. Previously a member of Jiggy Fellaz, Dynasty Family, New Dynasty and Uptown crews. Also known as "1-Shot" and "OG" with Uptown. Previously participated in season 6 as a member of Team Feel Ghood Music. Originally passed the Rapper Open Evaluation Round with 300,000 won, he was not seen in the Fight Money Battle Round. There is a possibility that he has voluntarily left the show, reasons unknown.
 Ness : Korean-American rapper currently signed under iiA, also known by the moniker 'Noctunes'. Previously participated in season 6 as a member of Team H1GHR MUSIC. Eliminated in the Rapper Open Evaluation Round.
 Ryno : Member of the hip-hop collective crew New Area Aliens. Previously participated in season 6 as a member of Team Dynamic Duo. Eliminated in the Fight Money Battle Round.
 Simba Zawadi : Rapper under Luminant Entertainment. Previously auditioned in season 6. Prior to this season, he had a three-year feud between him, judge/producer Paloalto and his record label Hi-Lite Records. However, Paloalto extended his hand to Simba Zawadi and congratulated him after passing the Rapper Open Evaluation Round, marking the end of their long-standing feud. Eliminated in the Fight Money Battle Round.
 Swervy : The only female rapper this season to advance further to the Fight Money Battle Round. Member of Team YAYA crew. Eliminated in the Fight Money Battle Round. She became the first female artist to sign with Hi-Lite Records after the show ended.
 Jo Woo-jin : Rapper who previously participated in season 2. He dissed judge/producer Swings, who was also a participant in season 2, through a track titled "Switch" in 2017. At the Rapper Selection Round, he volunteered to be judged by Swings. Swings was upset upon seeing him due to this issue, but then passed him after his rap, saying that he has improved his rapping skills. He was eliminated in the Rapper Open Evaluation Round.
 Louie : One-half of the rap duo Geeks and member BUCKWILDS crew, signed under Rainbow Bridge World. His rap partner, Lil Boi, participated in season 4 as a member of Team AOMG. Louie was eliminated in the Fight Money Battle Round.
 Dayday : Former member of Dalmatian. Known by his real name David Kim. Previously participated in season 4 and season 5 both as a member of Team AOMG. Eliminated in the Fight Money Battle Round.
 NO:EL : Rapper under Indigo Music, the sub-label of Just Music, and part of the COZYBOYS crew alongside fellow contestant Kid Milli. Known by his real name Jang Yong-joon. Previously participated in season 6 and dropped out of the first season of High School Rapper due to prostitution and bullying controversies. Eliminated in the Revival Round.
 H2ADIN : Second runner-up and fourth-runner up of the first and second season of High School Rapper respectively. Known by his real name Jo Won-woo. Eliminated in the Fight Money Battle Round.
 JJK : Veteran freestyle rapper and Leader of the Angdreville Crew (ADV). Previously participated in season 6. Eliminated in the Fight Money Battle Round.
 Bully Da Ba$tard : Ex-member of DICKIDS crew. Previously auditioned for season 6 but was disqualified after posting on social media that he passed that season's preliminary round before that season started its broadcast. He also was a contestant on the first and second season of High School Rapper having both Swings and Deepflow as mentors. Eliminated in the Revival Round.
 Changstarr : Korean-American rapper who has a great appreciation to the hippie culture. He assisted in providing English translations of Swings' Just Music label music tracks and also made a cameo on Lil Uzi Vert's P's and Q's music video. During the Fight Money Battle Round, he made a comment on the show's female DJ Vani "She's really hot though" prior to the start of the performance. However, he suddenly forgot his lyrics, causing him to be eliminated. Judge/producer Swings commented that saying such comments will obviously cause him to forget his lyrics, while judges/producers The Quiett and Code Kunst stated that he should not have auditioned for the show if he is not serious enough to compete. At the end of the show, Changstarr explained through his Instagram account that he made the comment on the DJ in an attempt to lighten up the mood of the judges/producers and the remaining contestants due to the very long and exhausting recording schedule for that round. Furthermore, he clarified that he was not nervous at that time but was very exhausted, causing him to forget his lyrics.
 New Champ : Previously participated in season 4 where he was a member of Team YG, and auditioned in seasons 3 and 6. Signed under FAME Records’ sub-label Urbane Music. Eliminated after the Team Choosing Round despite being chosen by Team Hi-Lite & AOMG, after Loopy replaced him from the team.
 Boo Hyun-seok : Previously participated in season 3 as a member of Team Brand New Music. Also known by his rapper name SNAP OUT. Eliminated after the Team Choosing Round despite being chosen by Team Illionaire Ambition, after Superbee replaced him from the team.
 Black Nine : Known for his hardcore rap style. Previously participated in season 6 as a member of Team Feel GHood Music where he eventually signed to their label company two months after that season ended. Eliminated after the Team Choosing Round despite being chosen by Team VMC, after EK replaced him from the team.
 Lee Su-rin : Rapper and ex-leader of Dickids crew and member of XXYXNAF crew. Signed under FAME Records. Previously participated in season 5 and the first season of High School Rapper. Also known by his rap names LUDA, TRAPSTARSUREEN, UNOFFICIALBOYY, and Baddie Homie. Eliminated after the Team Choosing Round despite being chosen by Team Illionaire Ambition, after Coogie replaced him from the team.
 Zene The Zilla : Member of Young Thugs Club (YTC). Eliminated after the Team Choosing Round despite being chosen by Team VMC, after Los replaced him from the team. He signed with Ambition Musik in 2019.
 Sway D : Rapper and producer under Hi-Lite Records. Eliminated in the Rapper Open Evaluation Round.

Controversies
 D.Ark was involved in a controversy, which explained that a 20-year-old woman, who claimed to be his ex-girlfriend, posted on social media that he had an intimate relationship with her, and alleged he made her engage in "forced relations" during their relationship. After this controversy blew up, D.Ark posted a public apology through his personal Instagram, and stated that "he did meet with the female who made the allegation". He also mentioned that the two have cleared up the misunderstanding. Regarding this controversy, Mnet have released an official statement that they will only air footage of D.Ark that is necessary to properly convey the efforts of the other contestants and the judges, instead of completely editing him out. His song for the 1st Live Performances, titled "Trap Middle School Kid", was not released on various music sites, and his performance of the song on the show was also not uploaded on the official Mnet channel.
 At the end of the 1st Live Performances Round, fans were outraged due to the outcome of EK vs. Kid Milli's match-up in which they believed that voting was based on popularity over performance. Although both performances were entertaining, most fans, even some of those who supported Kid Milli, believed that EK's performance stood out more and had a more dynamic presence that dominated the atmosphere. In fact, the entire audience cheered for EK similar to how Nafla did for him during the Group Battle Round. Despite this, Kid Milli won the match-up with a landslide. Fans believed that Kid Milli felt sorry for them, stating that the audience favored him over EK due to his popularity. Others praised EK for featuring his own dance crew, Most Badass Asian (M.B.A) and presented one of the most legendary performances in Show Me The Money history, without any featuring artist.

Discography

Notes

References

4
2018 South Korean television seasons